The word Shiv or shiv may refer to:

People with the name
 Shivnarine Chanderpaul, a West Indies cricketer nicknamed Shiv

Arts, entertainment, and media
 Shiv, a fictional location in Magic: The Gathering, see Dominaria
 Shiv, a villain in the animated series Static Shock

Other uses
 Shiv (weapon), a type of sharp weapon
 Shiv, a shortened form of the name Siobhan
 Shiv, a local Marathi name for Sion, Mumbai
 Shiv, or Shiva, a Hindu deity
 Hemp shiv, the woody waste material from flax, hemp, and linseed plants
 Simian human immunodeficiency virus (SHIV)